Tunduru is a town in Tunduru District, Ruvuma Region, Tanzania, East Africa. It is the administrative seat for Tunduru District, and is administratively divided into two wards; Mlingoti West (Mlingoti Magharibi) and Mlingoti East (Mlingoti Mashariki).

Notes

Populated places in Ruvuma Region